This is a list of seasons completed by the National Football League (NFL)'s Miami Dolphins, an American football franchise based in the Miami metropolitan area.

Although the Miami Dolphins were not successful before joining the NFL, from 1970 when they played their first season after the AFL–NFL merger until 2001 they were one of the most successful teams in the league, playing in the postseason on 22 occasions over those 32 years, winning 335 and tying two of 527 games for an overall win percentage of 63.75, and suffering a mere two losing seasons out of 32. Early in this period the Dolphins won their only two Super Bowls in consecutive seasons (becoming the second team to do so in the Super Bowl era), in the process achieving the only modern-day perfect season in any major professional sports league during only their third year in the NFL. Much of this success was orchestrated by coach Don Shula who joined the team in 1970 and stayed with them until his retirement in 1995.

After Shula retired in 1995, the Dolphins remained a force for six years under successors Jimmy Johnson and Dave Wannstedt, but since 2002 and especially since 2004 have fallen on harder times, reaching the postseason only twice in the eighteen seasons since, and during the mid-2000s, briefly intensifying the Dolphins-Patriots rivalry, when Nick Saban, a former Bill Belichick assistant, was hired as the Dolphins head coach in 2005; Saban spent two seasons as the head coach of the dolphins before leaving for Alabama.In 2007, they narrowly avoided an imperfect season by beating the Baltimore Ravens for their first and only win of the year. The next year, the Dolphins became the first team in NFL history to win their division following a 1–15 season; until 2020, it was the last time when the AFC East was not won by the New England Patriots. Since 2000 (the last season they won a playoff game), the Dolphins have made the postseason three times, but never progressed past the Wild Card round.

For complete team history, see History of the Miami Dolphins.

Seasons

Note: Records current through the end of the 2022 NFL season

1 Due to a strike-shortened season in 1982, teams were ranked by conference instead of division

References

External links
 

 
Miami Dolphins
seasons